Mylavaram mandal is one of the 20 mandals in the NTR district of the Indian state of Andhra Pradesh. It is under the administration of Vijayawada revenue division and the headquarters are located at Mylavaram town. It is one of mandals of the district located at the boundary of the state. Some of the villages in the mandal are part of the Andhra Pradesh Capital Region under the jurisdiction of APCRDA.

Government and politics 
Mylavaram mandal is under Mylavaram (Assembly constituency), which in turn represents Vijayawada (Lok Sabha constituency) of Andhra Pradesh. The present MLA representing Machilipatnam (Assembly constituency) is Vasantha Venkata Krishna Prasad of YSR Congress Party.

Villages 
As of 2011 census, the mandal has 17 villages. Mylavaram is the most populated village and Mulakalapanta is the least populated village in the mandal.

The settlements in the mandal are listed below:

 Chandragudem
 Chandrala
 Dasullapalem
 Ganapavaram
 Jangalapalli
 Kanimerla
 Keerthirayanigudem
 Morusumilli
 Mulakalapanta
 Mylavaram
 Pondugula
 Pulluru
 Sabjapadu
 T.Gannavaram
 Tholukodu
 Vedurubeedem
 Velvadam
 Badava
 kothagudem

References 

Mandals in NTR district